Pyotr Yeryomin (born July 14, 1992) is a Russian professional ice hockey goaltender. He is currently playing with Amur Khabarovsk of the Kontinental Hockey League (KHL).

Yeryomin made his Kontinental Hockey League debut playing with Amur Khabarovsk during the 2013–14 season.

References

External links

Living people
1992 births
Amur Khabarovsk players
Russian ice hockey goaltenders
People from Elektrostal
Sportspeople from Moscow Oblast